Felipe Ochagavía Eguiguren, (born 9 September 1993) is a Chilean former footballer who played as a goalkeeper.

Career

Youth career

Ochagavía started his career at Primera División de Chile club O'Higgins. He progressed from the under categories club all the way to the senior team.

O'Higgins
Ochagavía won the Apertura 2013-14 with O'Higgins. In the tournament, he didn't play in any game.

In 2014, he won the Supercopa de Chile against Deportes Iquique. In that match, he was in the bench as the second goalkeeper.

He participated with the club in the 2014 Copa Libertadores where they faced Deportivo Cali, Cerro Porteño and Lanús, being third and being eliminated in the group stage.

Celta Vigo B (loan)
In 2015, he had a stint with Celta Vigo B in the Segunda División B.

Magallanes (loan)
From 2016 to 2017, he played for Magallanes in the Primera B de Chile.

Personal life
Following his retirement, he started his studies at the Pontifical Catholic University of Chile and got a degree in Business Management.

At university level, he played for the Catholic University team.

Honours

Club
O'Higgins
Primera División: Apertura 2013-14
Supercopa de Chile: 2014

Individual

O'Higgins
Medalla Santa Cruz de Triana: 2014

References

External links
 Ochagavía at Football Lineups
 
 Felipe Ochagavía at playmakerstats.com (English version of ceroacero.es)

1993 births
Living people
People from Rancagua
Chilean people of Basque descent
Chilean footballers
Chilean expatriate footballers
O'Higgins F.C. footballers
Celta de Vigo B players
Deportes Magallanes footballers
Magallanes footballers
Chilean Primera División players
Segunda División B players
Primera B de Chile players
Chilean expatriate sportspeople in Spain
Expatriate footballers in Spain
Association football goalkeepers